is a Japanese footballer currently playing as a midfielder.

Career statistics

Club

Notes

Honours
BG Pathum United
 Thai League 2: 2019

References

External links
 Ryutsu Keizai University stats

1989 births
Living people
Japanese footballers
Japanese expatriate footballers
Association football midfielders
Seiya Kojima
Seiya Kojima
Seiya Kojima
Seiya Kojima
Seiya Kojima
Abahani Limited (Dhaka) players
Nara Club players
Expatriate footballers in Thailand
Japanese expatriate sportspeople in Thailand
Expatriate footballers in Bangladesh
Japanese expatriate sportspeople in Bangladesh